Terrace Mountain may refer to:

 Terrace Mountain (New York), a peak in the Catskill Mountains
 Terrace Mountain (Washington), a peak in the Cascade Range
 Terrace Mountain (Park County, Wyoming), a peak in Yellowstone National Park

See also
 Terrace Mountain Trail, a hiking trail in Pennsylvania